James Nicholas “Nick” Adamson (born 11 April 1969) is a Bahamian-born sailor who represents the United States. He competed in the 1996 Summer Olympics.

References

1969 births
Living people
Sailors at the 1996 Summer Olympics – Laser
American male sailors (sport)
Olympic sailors of the United States
People from Freeport, Bahamas
Bahamian emigrants to the United States